Denver Clarence Grigsby (March 25, 1901 – November 10, 1973) was an outfielder in Major League Baseball. He played for the Chicago Cubs from 1923 to 1925, and as a starter on the 1924 Cubs.  Grigsby had a respectable career batting average of .289 with an on base percentage of .355 over a period of 199 MLB games.

References

External links

1901 births
1973 deaths
Major League Baseball outfielders
Chicago Cubs players
Baseball players from Kentucky
People from Jackson, Kentucky